The Doomwood Curse is a Big Finish Productions audio drama based on the long-running British science fiction television series Doctor Who.

Plot 
The Doctor and Charley arrive at a country estate in England in 1738 on the trail of a lost book, where besides a murderer who's on the loose, and the notorious highwayman Dick Turpin, something else, that could destroy the very fabric of reality itself, has journeyed there. The Doctor and Charley must solve the mystery before the whole world succumbs to it.

Cast 
The Doctor – Colin Baker
Charley Pollard – India Fisher
Dick Turpin – Nicky Henson
John – Jonathan Firth
Eleanor – Hayley Atwell
Sir Ralph – Trevor Cooper
Lady Sybil – Geraldine Newman
Susan – Daisy Douglas
Molly – Suzie Chard

References

External links 
Big Finish Productions – The Doomwood Curse
 The Doomwood Curse at Tetrapyriarbus – The DisContinuity Guide

2008 audio plays
Sixth Doctor audio plays
Fiction set in 1738